Lagrange's four-square theorem, also known as Bachet's conjecture, states that every natural number can be represented as a sum of four non-negative integer squares. That is, the squares form an additive basis of order four.

where the four numbers  are integers. For illustration, 3, 31, and 310 in several ways, can be represented as the sum of four squares as follows:

This theorem was proven by Joseph Louis Lagrange in 1770. It is a special case of the Fermat polygonal number theorem.

Historical development
From examples given in the Arithmetica, it is clear that Diophantus was aware of the theorem. This book was translated in 1621 into Latin by Bachet (Claude Gaspard Bachet de Méziriac), who stated the theorem in the notes of his translation. But the theorem was not proved until 1770 by Lagrange.

Later, in 1834, Carl Gustav Jakob Jacobi discovered a simple formula for the number of representations of an integer as the sum of four squares with his own four-square theorem.

The formula is also linked to Descartes' theorem of four "kissing circles", which involves the sum of the squares of the curvatures of four circles. This is also linked to Apollonian gaskets, which were more recently related to the Ramanujan–Petersson conjecture.

Proofs

The classical proof 
Several very similar modern versions of Lagrange's proof exist. The proof below is a slightly simplified version, in which the cases for which m is even or odd do not require separate arguments.

Proof using the Hurwitz integers 
Another way to prove the theorem relies on Hurwitz quaternions, which are the analog of integers for quaternions.

Generalizations
Lagrange's four-square theorem is a special case of the Fermat polygonal number theorem and Waring's problem. Another possible generalization is the following problem: Given natural numbers , can we solve

for all positive integers  in integers ? The case  is answered in the positive by Lagrange's four-square theorem. The general solution was given by Ramanujan. He proved that if we assume, without loss of generality, that  then there are exactly 54 possible choices for  such that the problem is solvable in integers  for all . (Ramanujan listed a 55th possibility , but in this case the problem is not solvable if .)

Algorithms

In 1986, Michael O. Rabin and Jeffrey Shallit proposed randomized polynomial-time algorithms for computing a single representation  for a given integer , in expected running time .

Number of representations

The number of representations of a natural number n as the sum of four squares is denoted by r4(n). Jacobi's four-square theorem states that this is eight times the sum of the divisors of n if n is odd and 24 times the sum of the odd divisors of n if n is even (see divisor function), i.e.

Equivalently, it is eight times the sum of all its divisors which are not divisible by 4, i.e.

We may also write this as

where the second term is to be taken as zero if n is not divisible by 4. In particular, for a prime number p we have the explicit formula .

Some values of r4(n) occur infinitely often as  whenever n is even. The values of r4(n)/n can be arbitrarily large: indeed, r4(n)/n is infinitely often larger than 8.

Uniqueness

The sequence of positive integers which have only one representation as a sum of four squares (up to order) is:

1, 2, 3, 5, 6, 7, 8, 11, 14, 15, 23, 24, 32, 56, 96, 128, 224, 384, 512, 896 ... .

The sequence of positive integers which cannot be represented as a sum of four non-zero squares is:

1, 2, 3, 5, 6, 8, 9, 11, 14, 17, 24, 29, 32, 41, 56, 96, 128, 224, 384, 512, 896 ... .

Further refinements
Lagrange's four-square theorem can be refined in various ways. For example, Zhi-Wei Sun proved that each natural number can be written as a sum of four squares with some requirements on the choice of these four numbers.

One may also wonder whether it is necessary to use the entire set of square integers to write each natural as the sum of four squares.

See also
 Fermat's theorem on sums of two squares
 Fermat's polygonal number theorem
 Waring's problem
 Legendre's three-square theorem
 Sum of two squares theorem
 Sum of squares function
 15 and 290 theorems

Notes

References

External links
Proof at PlanetMath.org
Another proof
an applet decomposing numbers as sums of four squares
OEIS index to sequences related to sums of squares and sums of cubes

Additive number theory
Articles containing proofs
Squares in number theory
Theorems in number theory